The Techno 293 is a development of the Aloha class and is primarily for the youth windsurfing class. The class is recognised by the International Sailing Federation. The design was chosen to be the windsurfer for the Youth Olympic Games. It is normally used as a preceding step to the Olympic class RS:X.

Events

World Championships
The techno 293 world championships have been held annually since 2006.

Open Under 17

Open Under 15

Male Under 17

Male Under 15

Female Under 17

Female Under 15

Youth Olympics

The class has been used at the Youth Olympics

References

External links
 International Class Association Website
  ISAF Techno 293 Microsite Website
  ISAF Homepage

 
Classes of World Sailing
Windsurfing equipment
Youth Olympic sailing classes